Moojeeba is a town in the Shire of Cook, Queensland, Australia. The town is within the locality of Coen.

History 
Town of Moojeeba is present on a 1900 survey plan.

As at January 2021, Moojeeba has no buildings.

External links

References

Shire of Cook
Localities in Queensland